The stroma of the iris is a fibrovascular layer of tissue. It is the upper layer of two in the iris.

Structure
The stroma is a delicate interlacement of fibres. Some circle the circumference of the iris and the majority radiate toward the pupil. Blood vessels and nerves intersperse this mesh.

In dark eyes, the stroma often contains pigment granules. Blue eyes and the eyes of albinos, however, lack pigment.

The stroma connects to a sphincter muscle (sphincter pupillae), which contracts the pupil in a circular motion, and a set of dilator muscles (dilator pupillae) which pull the iris radially to enlarge the pupil, pulling it in folds. The back surface is covered by a commonly, heavily pigmented epithelial layer that is two cells thick (the iris pigment epithelium), but the front surface has no epithelium.  This anterior surface projects as the muscles dilate.

References

External links
 

Human iris